Motherwellia haplosciadea is a species of vines, constituting part of the plant family Araliaceae. This species is the only one known in the genus Motherwellia.

References

Araliaceae
Monotypic Apiales genera
Taxa named by Ferdinand von Mueller